Patricio Waldemar Palma Lafourcade (born 27 October 1978 in Osorno, Los Lagos) is a retired Chilean athlete who specialised in the hammer throw. He won multiple medals at the regional level. His younger sister, Odette, is also a hammer thrower.

His personal best of 70.78 meters, set in 2010, is the standing national record.

Competition record

References

1978 births
Living people
Chilean male hammer throwers
People from Osorno, Chile
Athletes (track and field) at the 2007 Pan American Games
Pan American Games competitors for Chile